Birichevo is a rural locality (a village) in Ust-Alexeyevskoye Rural Settlement, Velikoustyugsky District, Vologda Oblast, Russia. The population was 66 as of 2002.

Geography 
The distance to Veliky Ustyug is 58 km, to Ust-Alexeyevo is 6 km. Pozharovo is the nearest rural locality.

References 

Rural localities in Velikoustyugsky District